It's Happening Tomorrow is a 1988 Italian comedy film directed by Daniele Luchetti. It was screened in the Un Certain Regard section at the 1988 Cannes Film Festival.

Cast
 Paolo Hendel as Lupo
 Giovanni Guidelli as Edo
 Margherita Buy as Vera
 Claudio Bigagli as Diego Del Ghiana
 Quinto Parmeggiani as Enea Silvio Di Lampertico
 Giacomo Piperno as Cesare Del Ghiana
 Dario Cantarelli as Abbé Flambert
 Gianfranco Barra as Biagio
 Angela Finocchiaro as Lady Rowena
 Agnese Nano as Allegra
 Antonio Petrocelli as Terminio
 Nanni Moretti as Matteo, the charcoal burner
 Ugo Gregoretti as Marquis Lucifero
 Peter Willburger as Katowitz
 Ciccio Ingrassia as Gianloreto Bonacci

References

External links

1988 films
1988 comedy films
1980s Italian-language films
Italian comedy films
Films directed by Daniele Luchetti
Films set in Grosseto
Films set in Tuscany
Films set in the 1840s
Films scored by Nicola Piovani
1980s Italian films